Adriana Camelli (17 March 1928 – 18 January 1996) was an Argentine swimmer who competed at the 1948 Summer Olympics.

References

External links
 

1928 births
1996 deaths
Argentine female swimmers
Argentine people of Italian descent
Argentine female freestyle swimmers
Olympic swimmers of Argentina
Swimmers at the 1948 Summer Olympics
Sportspeople from Salta Province